The Sorrell SNS-2 Guppy is an American single-seat, negative stagger, cabin biplane designed for amateur construction that was produced in kit form by the Sorrell Aircraft Company of Tenino, Washington.  plans were available from Thunderbird Aviation  of Ray, Michigan.

Design
The SNS-2 Guppy is a wooden-built negative-stagger biplane with a fixed conventional landing gear with a tailwheel. Designed to use engines up to 36 hp (27 kW) the kit came with a  Rotax 377 engine.

Specifications

References

Notes

Bibliography

External links

1960s United States civil utility aircraft
Biplanes with negative stagger
Homebuilt aircraft
Guppy
Single-engined tractor aircraft
Aircraft first flown in 1967